Nancy J. King (born October 7, 1949) is an American politician from Maryland and a member of the Democratic Party. After serving five years in the Maryland House of Delegates, she was appointed to the Maryland State Senate in 2007. King represents Maryland's 39th district in Montgomery County. She serves on the Budget and Taxation Committee.

King was born in Niagara Falls, New York on October 7, 1949. She attended the Niagara County Community College. In the mid-1990s, King became active in a number of Montgomery County civic organizations, including Meals on Wheels, the PTA, and the Montgomery Village Foundation. She was elected to the school board for the Montgomery County Public Schools in 1994 and served there until her election to the Assembly. Since being elected to the General Assembly, she has been an advocate for education. She serves at the Senate Chair of the Joint Committee on Children, Youth and Families.
2006 Race for Maryland House of Delegates – 39th District
Voters to choose three:
{| class="wikitable"
|-
!Name
!Votes
!Percent
!Outcome
|-
|-
|Nancy J. King, Democratic
|18,651
|  23.5%
|   Won
|-
|-
|Charles E. Barkley, Democratic
|18,253 
|  23.0%
|   Won
|-
|-
|Saqib Ali, Democratic
|16,455
|  20.7%
|   Won
|-
|-
| David Nichols, Republican
|   9,278 
|   11.7%
|   Lost
|-
|-
| Gary Scott, Republican
|   8,363 
|   10.4%
|   Lost
|-
|-
|Bill Witham, Republican
|  8,244
|  10.4%
|   Lost
|}

References

External links
 

1949 births
21st-century American politicians
21st-century American women politicians
Living people
Democratic Party Maryland state senators
Democratic Party members of the Maryland House of Delegates
People from Montgomery Village, Maryland
Politicians from Niagara Falls, New York
Women state legislators in Maryland